The 1972 United Bank Classic, also known as the Denver WCT, was a men's tennis tournament played on indoor carpet courts in Denver, Colorado in the United States that was part of the 1972 World Championship Tennis circuit. It was the inaugural  edition of the tournament and took place from April 24 through April 30, 1972.  First-seeded Rod Laver won the first edition of both the doubles and singles competition. There was criticism by players, including Arthur Ashe, that the playing conditions on the Sporface carpet courts were too fast.

Finals

Singles

 Rod Laver defeated  Marty Riessen, 4–6, 6–3, 6–4

Doubles
 Roy Emerson /  Rod Laver defeated  Cliff Drysdale /  Roger Taylor, 1–6, 6–4, 6–3

Prize money

See also
 1972 Virginia Slims of Denver

References

External links
 ITF tournament edition details

United Bank Classic
Indoor tennis tournaments
United Bank Classic
United Bank Classic
United Bank Classic
United Bank Classic